Keith Raymond Chiasson is a Canadian politician, who was elected to the Legislative Assembly of New Brunswick in the 2018 election. He represents the electoral district of Tracadie-Sheila as a member of the Liberal Party.

Chiasson was re-elected in the 2020 provincial election.

Election results

|-

|-

References

Living people
New Brunswick Liberal Association MLAs
21st-century Canadian politicians
Year of birth missing (living people)